The Butler Bucks was the first name of a minor league baseball club based in Butler, Pennsylvania, from 1905 until 1908. The team was first established in 1905 as the Bucks, in honor of the team's manager, Ward Buckminister. The team then played their 1906 season in the Pennsylvania–Ohio–Maryland League and posted a 16-16 record, before moving to Piedmont, West Virginia, on July 14, 1906. In Piedmont the team posted a 1-20 record, before moving to Charleroi, Pennsylvania, on August 6, 1906, to finish up the season.

The team returned to Butler in 1907 as the Butler White Sox, a member of the Western Pennsylvania League. Managed by Alfred Lawson, a former player for the Pittsburgh Alleghenys and the Boston Beaneaters, the team posted a 58-44 record for second place in the league standings. The team began the season in Girard, Ohio, as an unnamed team, but on May 19, 1908, it moved to Butler. However the team's presence in Butler was short-lived. On June 15, 1908, the team moved to Erie, Pennsylvania, to become the Erie Sailors.

Butler would be without a professional baseball team until the Butler Indians were established in 1934.

Year-by-year record

References
Baseball Reference Butler, Pennsylvania

Baseball teams established in 1905
Defunct minor league baseball teams
1905 establishments in Pennsylvania
1908 disestablishments in Pennsylvania
Defunct baseball teams in Pennsylvania
Baseball teams disestablished in 1908
Butler, Pennsylvania
Ohio-Pennsylvania League teams